Shrirang Godbole (born 15 June 1960) is a Marathi theatre, television and film writer, director, actor, and lyricist.

Career
In 1979, he started his career as a stage actor when he joined Theatre Academy, Pune. He acted in Jabbar Patel's Ghashiram Kotwal, Padgham and Satish Alekar's Mahanirvan, Pralay, Bhint, Atireki. In 1986, he started writing his own plays. He started writing for Grips Theatre Movement in India. Godbole has directed many TV serials and films. Many events including Award Ceremonies, Sawai Gandharva Sangeet Mahotsav, The PIFF Bazar are coordinated by him. Recently he has started making content for education and his company, under his guidance, has developed a content making software- CDX (Content Delivery Express).

Playwright 
 Make Up (1986)
 Chhan Chhote Waitta Mothe (1986)
 Nako Re Baba (1989)
 Hach Khel Udya Punha (1990)
 Diwas Tuzey Hey (1993)
 Pahile Paan (1995)
 Pan Amhala Khelaychay (1997)
 Sangeet Namunyadakhal (1999)
 Eka Lagnachi Goshta (2005)
 Du & Me (2013)
 Der Gast is Gott (2014) 
 "Y" (2017)
Jamba Bamba Boo (2018)
Idiots (2019)
 Perplex 1.0 (2021)

TV serials
 Prarabdha (ETV Marathi 2001)
 Pimpalpaan (Alpha Marathi 2003)
 Ghadlay Bighadlay (Alpha Marathi 2003)
 Nakshatranche Dene (Alpha Marathi 2003)
 Agnihotra (Star Pravah 2008)
 Guntata Hriday He (Zee Marathi 2009)
 Amarprem (Zee Marathi 2009)
 Eka Lagnachi Dusri Goshta (Zee Marathi 2011)
 Shejari Shejari Pakke Shejari (Zee Marathi 2013)
 Eka Lagnachi Teesri Goshta (Zee Marathi 2013)
 Dhabal Ek Taas Timepass (Star Pravah 2014)
 Gund Purush Dev (ETV 2013)
 Hamma Live (Colors Marathi 2014)
 Ithech Taka Tambu (Zee Yuva 2016)
 Chupke Chupke (&TV 2017)
 Ti Phularani (Sony Marathi 2018)
 Sindhu (Fakta Marathi 2019)
 Agnihotra 2 (Star Pravah 2019)
 800 Khidkya 900 Dare (Sony Marathi 2020)

Lyrics
TV Serial Title Songs-

 SaReGaMaPa Title song (Zee Marathi)
 Ekapeksha Ek Title song (Zee Marathi)
 Hasyasamrat Title song (Zee Marathi)
 Ghadlay Bighadlay Title song (Zee Marathi)
 Tuzyat Jeev Rangala Title song (Zee Marathi)
 Nakatuchya Lagnala Title song (Zee Marathi)
 Lakha Lakha Chanderi - Zee Talkies Title song (Marathi)
 Beej Jase Ankurate - Zee Gaurav Title song (Marathi)
 Agnihotra Title song (Star Pravah)
 Gunda Purush Dev (ETV Marathi)
 Kon Honar Karodpati (Sony Marathi Promo Song)
 Guntata Hriday He Title song (Zee Marathi)
 Lagnachi Wife Wedding Chi Bayko (Zee Marathi)
 Home Minister (New)(Zee Marathi)
 Tee Phularani (Sony Marathi)
 Agabai Sasubai Title song  (Zee Marathi)
 Sindhu Title song (Fakta Marathi)
 Dev Pawala Title song (Fakta Marathi)
 Prem Poison Panga Title song (Zee Yuva)
 800 Khidkya 900 Dara (Sony Marathi) 
 Sahakutumb Sahaparivar (Star Pravah)
 Sukh Mhanaje Nakki Kay Asta (Star Pravah)

Film Songs

 Astitva (Hindi)
 Kaksparsha (Hindi)
 Jabardast
 Vedya Mana
 Full Three Dhamal
 Agabai Arechhya
 De Dhakka
 Sadhi Manasa
 Chashmebahaddar
 Mumbai-Pune-Mumbai 1
 Mumbai Pune Mumbai 2
 Mee Shivajiraje Bhosale Boltoy
 Tee Sadhya Kay Kartey
 Vitti Dandu 
 F.U.
 Lokmanya Tilak
 Cycle
 Mazee Shala
 Aawhan
 Be Dune Sade Char
 Nau Mahine Nau Diwas
 Porbazar
 Superstar
 Dubhang
 Vees Mhanaje Vees
 Ubuntu 
 Pitruroon
 Chintoo 2
 Baji 
Pune 52

Dialogues
 Jis Desh Me Ganga Raheta Hai
 Baji (film)

Film producer
 Pune 52 
 Chintoo 1 (2012) 
 Pune 52
 Chintoo 2 Khajinyachi Chittarkatha (2013)
 Pitrurun
 Tuhya Dharma Koncha

Executive producer
 Harischandrachi Factory

Personal
Godbole's son Suhrud Godbole is married to the Marathi film and television actress Girija Oak. His daughter Mrinmayee Godbole is a film actress.

References

 
 
 

Male actors in Marathi cinema
Living people
1960 births
Marathi people
Male actors from Mumbai